Kamares ware is a distinctive type of Minoan pottery produced in Crete during the Minoan period, dating to MM IA (ca. 2100 BCE). By the LM IA period (ca. 1450), or the end of the First Palace Period, these wares decline in distribution and "vitality". They have traditionally been interpreted as a prestige artifact, possibly used as an elite table-ware.

The designs of Kamares ware are typically executed in white, red and blue on a black field. Typical designs include abstract floral motifs.  Surviving examples include ridged cups, small, round spouted jars, and large storage jars (pithoi), on which combinations of abstract curvilinear designs and stylized plant and marine motifs are painted in white and tones of red, orange, and yellow on black grounds.

The Kamares style was often elaborate, with complex patterns on pottery of eggshell thinness. Sets of cups and jugs have been found, and it has been suggested that these may have been used in ritual, though Kamares pottery presumably also graced the dining tables of the First Palaces.

The first Kamares pottery was found in the excavations conducted by Flinders Petrie at Lahun, Egypt. This material is now in the British Museum.

Historical development 
The early forms of Kamares ware appeared during the Middle Minoan IA period (ca. 2100 BCE). Such pottery appeared at Knossos, in the palace's West Court, at Mochlos and Vasiliki in eastern Crete, as well as at Patrikies in the Messara Plain of southern Crete. Contemporary pottery was also found at Malia.

Polychromy in a light-on-dark style already begins in this phase. This style was characterized by white and red/orange colours on a solidly painted dark ground.

A relief decoration known as barbotine also appears at this time. It includes three-dimensional decorations, as well as the use of the ceramic slip. Ridges and protuberances of various types are seen on the surface of vessels.

But some scholars place barbotine ware a bit earlier,

 "Barbotine Ware appears, in its earliest stages, a bit before MM IA, in EM III. The style gradually becomes more popular and picks up significantly in MM IA, along with the conservative incised style, dark on light style, and White on Dark Ware."

Plenty of MM IA pottery is found at the coastal sites of the eastern Peloponnese. Some pieces have also been found further east, on Samos and on Cyprus, and also at Kastri, Cythera, where some Cretans settled at that time.

Middle Minoan IB 
At this time (2000-1850), big palaces are constructed at Knossos and Phaistos. The pottery found there is now made using the fast potter's wheel; this marks the beginning of the Classical Kamares style.

The pots are now characterized by increasingly thinner walls, and are using more complex polychrome decorations. Some features of this pottery indicate that it was designed to appear similar to metalwork (in other words, it imitated bronze vessels).

At El-Lisht, in Egypt, (near the Amenemhat I’s pyramid), several Classical Kamares sherds dating to MM IB or MM II have been found. Amenemhat I belonged to the Twelfth Dynasty of Egypt.

Middle Minoan IIA-B 
This is the period when the Classical Kamares ware reached its great sophistication. Most of these ceramics are found at the palatial sites of Knossos, Phaistos, and Mallia, so it was a high-prestige ware. But at most other Minoan sites, directly after MM IB comes the MM IIIA ware.

A major destruction horizon is seen at Knossos and Phaistos at the end of MM IIB. This is also the time when the Protopalatial or Old Palace period ended.

The best Kamares ware is also known as eggshell ware, because of its thinness and delicacy. It is decorated with complex abstract patterns, but now the first representations of stylized plants and animals appear. The decoration is in a light-on-dark style; white colour, and a number of shades of red, orange, and yellow are used.

Middle Minoan IIIA-B 
During the period around 1700 BC, the palaces at Knossos Phaistos and elsewhere have been rebuilt. While the high quality pottery is still being produced in abundance, the artistic decoration is no longer considered a priority. This is also known as the Post-Kamares phase, according to Walberg.

At this time, Minoan influence expands throughout the southern Aegean, and reaches the Greek mainland.

Different types of Kamares ware were excavated in Egypt. There are also many Egyptian imitations of Kamares ware,

 "Minoan sherds have been found at sites such as Avaris, Kahun, el-Haraga, Lisht, and Buhen. “Minoanizing” pottery has been found at Sidmant, Abydos, Aniba, Kerma, Arminna, Deir el-Medina, Gurob, and Kom Rabia’a."

Gallery 
Gallery of pieces from Heraklion Archaeological Museum, Crete

References

Further reading 
MacGillivray, J.A. 1998. Knossos: Pottery Groups of the Old Palace Period BSA Studies 5. (British School at Athens)  Bryn Mawr Classical Review 2002
Walberg, Gisela. 1986. Tradition and Innovation. Essays in Minoan Art (Mainz am Rhein: Verlag Philipp Von Zabern)

External links 

Ancient Greek pottery
Minoan vase painting